Color Bars may refer to:

 Color Bars (EP), by Tokyo Jihen, 2012
 "Color Bars", a song on the Elliott Smith album Figure 8

See also
 EBU colour bars
 SMPTE color bars